Samsar Chand Kaul (Koul) (1883–1977) was a teacher, writer and naturalist from Kashmir. He taught Geography at the Tyndale Biscoe School in Srinagar, Kashmir and wrote several books.

His books include Beautiful Valleys of Kashmir & Ladakh  (at least 3 editions), Birds of Kashmir and Srinagar & Its Environs in the 1940s.

Kaul hailed from Rainawari in Srinagar, Kashmir.

References

External links
Biography of Samsar Chand Kaul
Birds of Kashmir (1939)
Beautiful Valleys Of Kashmir (1942)

Kashmiri people
1883 births
1977 deaths